Notodden Stadion is the former homepitch for the Norwegian football team Notodden FK.

External links
 Notodden FK webpage in Norwegian
 Notodden Stadium

Notodden
Football venues in Norway
Notodden FK